Émile Appay (1876–1935) was a French landscape painter.

He studied under Henri-Joseph Harpignies and  Paul Lecomte. He was a friend of  André Derain.

From 1922 to 1932 he travelled around several countries in Europe, while helping to make stage sets for the Georges Pitoëff theatre troupe.

Exhibitions 
Some exhibitions of Appay in different galleries in Paris :
 Galerie Georges Petit
 Galerie Pierre Le Chevallier
 Galerie Jules Gautier 

His paintings were also shown at the  Salon des artistes français from 1910 to 1920.

Paintings 

 Le Port de Marseille – Aquarelle (38 x 57 cm)
 Rue des halles et tour Charlemagne à Tours – Aquarelle (39,5 x 29 cm)
 Menton – (70 x 54 cm)
 Pont sur la Seine à Rouen – Peinture, Huile/toile (38x55 cm)
 Vue de la Salute, Venise – Peinture, Huile/toile (38x55 cm)
 Rue de Louviers animée (Eure) – Aquarelle (33x44 cm).
 Le Château Gaillard – Au petit Andely – Aquarelle (60x75 cm)

References

External links 
 http://www.askart.com/AskART/artists/search/Search_Repeat.aspx?searchtype=IMAGES&artist=11085807

19th-century French painters
French male painters
20th-century French painters
20th-century French male artists
French landscape painters
1876 births
1935 deaths
19th-century French male artists